The 2017 FFA Cup was the fourth season of the FFA Cup, the main national soccer knockout cup competition in Australia. 32 teams began competing in the competition proper (from the round of 32), including the 10 A-League teams and 21 Football Federation Australia (FFA) member federation teams determined through individual state qualifying rounds, as well as the reigning National Premier Leagues Champion (Sydney United 58 from NSW).

Round and dates

Prize fund
The prize fund is unchanged from the 2016 event.

In addition, a further $2,500 was donated from sponsor NAB to Member Federation clubs for each goal scored by them against an A-League opposition. Clubs to receive donations are Blacktown City ($12,500), Hakoah Sydney City East ($5,000), Heidelberg United ($2,500) and South Melbourne ($2,500).

Preliminary rounds

FFA member federations teams will compete in various state-based preliminary rounds to win one of 21 places in the competition proper (round of 32). All Australian clubs are eligible to enter the qualifying process through their respective FFA member federation, however only one team per club is permitted entry in the competition. All nine FFA member federations are expected to take part in the tournament.

The preliminary rounds will operate within a consistent national structure whereby club entry into the competition is staggered in each state/territory, ultimately leading to round 7 with the winning clubs from that round gaining direct entry into the round of 32. The first matches of the preliminary rounds began in February 2017, and the final matches of the preliminary rounds in June 2017.

Teams 
A total of 32 teams will participate in the 2017 FFA Cup competition proper, ten of which will come from the A-League, one being the 2016 National Premier Leagues Champion (Sydney United 58), and the remaining 21 teams from FFA member federations, as determined by the qualifying rounds. A-League clubs represent the highest level in the Australian league system, whereas member federation clubs come from Level 2 and below. The current season tier of member federation clubs is shown in parentheses.

Bracket

Round of 32
The Round of 32 draw took place on 29 June 2017, with match information confirmed on 3 July.

The lowest ranked sides that qualified for this round were Bankstown Berries, Hills Brumbies, Peninsula Power and Western Knights. They were the only level 3 teams left in the competition.

All times listed below are at AEST

Round of 16
The Round of 16 draw took place on 9 August 2017, immediately following matchday 4 of the round of 32, with match information confirmed on 11 August.

The lowest ranked side that qualified for this round was Bankstown Berries. They were the only level 3 team left in the competition.

All times listed below are at AEST

Quarter-finals
The quarter-finals draw took place on 29 August 2017, immediately following the final matchday of the round of 16, with match information confirmed on 31 August.

The lowest ranked sides that qualified for this round were Blacktown City, Gold Coast City, Heidelberg United and South Melbourne. They were the only level 2 teams left in the competition.

All times listed below are at AEST

Semi-finals
The semi-finals draw took place on 20 September 2017, immediately following the final matchday of the quarter-finals, with match information confirmed on 25 September.

The lowest ranked side that qualified for this round was South Melbourne. They were the only level 2 team left in the competition.

All times listed below are at AEDT

Final
All times listed below are at AEDT

Top goalscorers

Broadcasting rights
The live television rights for the competition were held by the subscription network Fox Sports. In addition to live updates and crosses at concurrent matches, the following matches were broadcast live:

References

External links
 Official website

FFA Cup
2017 in Australian soccer
Australia Cup seasons